Juan Carlos Pérez Rojo (born 17 November 1959) is a Spanish former football forward and manager.

Club career
Born in Barcelona, Catalonia, Rojo played five years in the first team of local club FC Barcelona, although he only had one solid season (1984–85, playing 29 games and scoring two goals en route to a La Liga title). After suffering a severe knee injury in 1986, he never recovered fully.

Rojo spent nearly two years without making one single appearance, the latter already at Andalusia's Real Betis which would be also relegated from the top flight. He finally retired in 1990 at only 30, after an unassuming spell at Barça neighbours Palamós CF in the Segunda División.

In the 2007–08 campaign, after several years in charge of Barcelona's youth sides, Rojo had his first head coaching experience, working with Terrassa FC in the Segunda División B and being dismissed in April 2008 after a 0–2 home loss against Ontinyent CF.

International career
Rojo earned four caps for Spain, the first coming on 23 January 1985 in a 3–1 friendly win over Finland, in Alicante. Additionally, he participated with the under-20s at the 1979 FIFA World Youth Championship.

Honours
Barcelona
La Liga: 1984–85
Supercopa de España: 1983
UEFA Champions League runner-up: 1985–86

References

External links

1959 births
Living people
Spanish footballers
Footballers from Barcelona
Association football forwards
La Liga players
Segunda División players
Segunda División B players
FC Barcelona Atlètic players
FC Barcelona players
Real Betis players
Palamós CF footballers
Spain youth international footballers
Spain under-21 international footballers
Spain international footballers
Spanish football managers
Segunda División B managers
Tercera División managers
Terrassa FC managers
FC Santboià managers